Qasrik (also Romanized as Qaşrīk; also known as Qaşr-e Yek) is a village in Rowzeh Chay Rural District, in the Central District of Urmia County, West Azerbaijan Province, Iran. At the 2006 census, its population was 358, in 58 families.

References 

Populated places in Urmia County